Isaac Vorsah (born 21 June 1988) is a Ghanaian international footballer who plays as a centre-back. Born in Accra, Vorsah started his career playing in his Kpando in the Volta Region later joining Gamba All Blacks F.C. in 2015. He secured a deal to Ghanaian giants Kumasi Asante Kotoko after his impressive performances. Vorsah joined TSG 1899 Hoffenheim on an initial loan deal in 2007, after impressing on a trail. He secured a permanent deal which resulted in him playing 130 matches and scored 4 goals in all competitions for TSG 1899 Hoffenheim over a span of 5 seasons from 2007 to 2012. He played for Ghana at four major international tournaments, including three African Cup of Nations (AFCON) in 2010, 2012, 2013 and at the 2010 World Cup in South Africa.

Club career

Early career in Ghana 
Vorsah's primary position is as a centre back, but he can also play as defensive midfielder. He began his career at Oscar FC in Kpando, Ghana and later moved to FC Maamobi. He transferred to Gamba All Blacks F.C. in 2005. In January 2007 the Kumasi based team Asante Kotoko bought Vorsah.

TSG 1899 Hoffenheim 
After six month with Asante Kotoko, German side TSG 1899 Hoffenheim offered him a trial. After the trial he was loaned until 30 June 2008. He satisfied the management and on 1 April 2008 TSG 1899 Hoffenheim used their option to buy him and he signed a contract until 30 June 2011. Vorsah left the club in 2012, after playing 110 league matches and scoring 4 goals between 2007 and 2012.

Red Bull Salzburg 
Vorsah moved to Red Bull Salzburg in August 2012. In 2015 Vorsah joined the farm team FC Liefering. In 2016, he left Liefering.

ASFAR 
After parting ways with Red Bull Salzburg and FC Liefering, in January 2017, Vorsah signed a two-year contract with Moroccan side ASFAR until 2019. He joined the club on a free transfer.

Al Ohod 
Vorsah signed for Saudi Arabian side Al Ohod club. He signed a one-year contract with the Madina-based club. Before signing for Al Ohod, there were reports of him urging towards a deal with Norwegian side Sogndal and Danish side AC Horsens. In the first week of February 2018, he was named in the team of the week in the Saudi Professional League following a stupendous display for Ohod.

International career 
He made his national team debut against Senegal on 21 August 2007 after he had formerly represented his homeland at U-23 level. He was part of Ghana's Olympic team, the Black Meteors. He was named in Ghana's 23-man squad for the 2010 FIFA World Cup and played in the opener before an injury kept him out of the following matches, but he returned from injury in time to play Ghana's final match of the tournament, the quarter-final.

Career statistics

Club

1Includes other competitive competitions.

International

International goals
Scores and results list Ghana's goal tally first.

Honours

Club
Red Bull Salzburg
 Austrian Bundesliga: 2013–14, 2014–15
 Austrian Cup: 2013–14

International
Ghana
 Africa Cup of Nations runner-up: 2010

Individual 

 Ghana Defender of the Year: 2007

References

External links
 

1988 births
Living people
Ghanaian footballers
Ghana international footballers
2010 Africa Cup of Nations players
2010 FIFA World Cup players
2012 Africa Cup of Nations players
2013 Africa Cup of Nations players
Ghanaian expatriate footballers
TSG 1899 Hoffenheim players
FC Red Bull Salzburg players
Expatriate footballers in Germany
Association football defenders
Association football utility players
Asante Kotoko S.C. players
Bundesliga players
2. Bundesliga players
All Blacks F.C. players
Expatriate footballers in Saudi Arabia
Saudi Professional League players
Ohod Club players
Expatriate footballers in Morocco
AS FAR (football) players
Ghanaian expatriate sportspeople in Morocco